"In Darkness and Confusion" is a short story written by Ann Petry, published in the third volume of Cross Section in 1947.

References

Harlem in fiction